Boris Anatolievich Dubrovin (6 April 1950 – 19 March 2019) was a Russian mathematician, Doctor of Physical and Mathematical Sciences (1984). After his death, the Dubrovin Medal was created in his memory, and is awarded to promising researchers who make outstanding contributions to the fields of mathematical physics and geometry.

Biography 
He graduated from the Faculty of Mechanics and Mathematics of Moscow State University (1972). In 1988–1993. Professor of the Department of Higher Geometry and Topology. Since 1990 Professor Scuola Internazionale Superiore di Studi Avanzati (SISSA) (Trieste, Italy).

Freelance member of the Department of Geometry and Topology of the Steklov Institute of Mathematics.

Area of scientific interests: theory of integrable systems in geometry and physics: Frobenius manifolds, Gromov–Witten invariants, singularity theory, normal forms of integrable partial differential equations, Hamiltonian perturbations of hyperbolic systems, geometry of isomonodromic deformations, theta functions on Riemann surfaces, and nonlinear waves.

In 1998 he was an Invited Speaker of the International Congress of Mathematicians in Berlin.

Bibliography
 Modern Geometry (1979)
 Modern Geometry. Methods and Applications (1982)
 Modern Geometry. Part 3. Methods of Homology Theory (1984)
 Modern Geometry — Methods and Applications. Part III. Introduction to Homology Theory (1990)
 Modern Geometry. Methods and Applications. Volume 1. Geometry of Surfaces, Transformation groups, and Fields
 Modern Geometry. Methods and Applications. Volume 2. Geometry and Topology of Manifolds (2013)
 Modern Geometry. Methods and applications. Volume 3. Theory of Homology (2013)
 Topology, Geometry, Integrable Systems, and Mathematical Physics: Novikov’s Seminar 2012–2014 (2014)

References

External links
 Летопись Московского университета
 Журналы Отделения математики РАН
 SISSA People Personal Home Pages

1950 births
2019 deaths
Moscow State University alumni
Academic staff of Moscow State University
Soviet mathematicians
20th-century Russian mathematicians
21st-century Russian mathematicians